"Give It Up" is a song by English band Talk Talk, released by Parlophone in 1986 as the third single from their third studio album The Colour of Spring. The song was written by Mark Hollis and Tim Friese-Greene, and produced by Friese-Greene. "Give It Up" peaked at number 59 in the UK Singles Chart.

Critical reception
Upon its release as a single, Jim Reid of Record Mirror described "Give It Up" as "well polished, airbrushed even" and commented that "I can see their appeal as light purveyors of ambient pop". He added, "Trouble is, the mood, the sound never seems to change. They're better than Tears for Fears though." The Huddersfield Daily Examiner felt the song's elevation to single status resulted in the band "continu[ing] in the laidback psychedelic groove" and commented, "'Give It Up' takes a few listens, and as such might not have the impact of 'Life's What You Make It'. Still, it's a goodie." In his 2019 retrospective "Celebrating the Genius of Mark Hollis in 15 Songs", Ryan Leas of Stereogum described it as "emblematic of the soulful and organ-drenched sound" of The Colour of Spring and noted Hollis' voice for how "he could take a simple and empty phrase like 'give it up' and make it feel profound in his reading of it".

Track listing
7–inch single (UK, Europe and New Zealand)
"Give It Up" – 5:16
"Pictures of Bernadette" – 5:00

7–inch single (Canada)
"Give It Up" (Edited version) – 4:59
"Pictures of Bernadette" – 5:00

12–inch single (UK, Europe, Canada and New Zealand)
"Give It Up" – 5:16
"Pictures of Bernadette" (Dance-Mix) – 8:00
"Pictures of Bernadette" (7" version) – 5:00

12–inch promotional single (US)
"Give It Up" (Edited version) – 4:59
"Give It Up" – 5:16

Personnel
Credits are adapted from The Colour of Spring CD liner notes and the 12-inch single sleeve notes.

"Give It Up"
 Mark Hollis – vocals, piano, mellotron
 Paul Webb – bass
 Lee Harris – drums
 Robbie McIntosh – dobro
 David Rhodes – guitar
 Tim Friese-Greene – organ
 Ian Curnow – instrumental
 Martin Ditcham  – percussion

Production
 Tim Friese-Greene – producer

Other
 James Marsh – illustration

Charts

References

1986 songs
1986 singles
Parlophone singles
Talk Talk songs
Songs written by Mark Hollis (musician)
Songs written by Tim Friese-Greene
Song recordings produced by Tim Friese-Greene